Bonnie Lenora "Jane" Nigh (February 25, 1925 – October 5, 1993) was an American actress.

Early years 
Her sister Nancy was also an actress, and her mother worked in research at a film studio.

Career 
She was discovered in 1944 by Arthur Wenzler while working in a defense plant. (Another source identifies Ivan Kahn as the 20th Century Fox talent scout.) She later signed a contract with Fox. She appeared in more than 40 films and television shows, including State Fair (1945), Give My Regards to Broadway (1948, as June Nigh) and County Fair (1950).

In 1949, she participated in a later famous Life magazine photo layout, in which she posed with other up-and-coming actresses, Marilyn Monroe, Lois Maxwell, Cathy Downs, Suzanne Dalbert, Enrica Soma and Laurette Luez.

She also had starring roles in a pair of Monogram Pictures films, Blue Grass of Kentucky and Rodeo. Nigh, along with Patrick McVey, co-starred in the TV series Big Town, with McVey playing the city editor of a newspaper, and Nigh his secretary. She had the role of Lorelei Kilbourne for two seasons.

Personal life
Nigh was married four times, to three men, all ending in divorce. Her longest marriage was to her second husband, Navy Lieutenant John Baker, while she was married twice to Norman Davidson Jr.

She had a total of four children, three girls and a boy, though her first, a girl, died very soon after birth in 1952.

Nigh died, due to a stroke, on October 5, 1993 at the age of 68.

Filmography

References

External links
 

American film actresses
American television actresses
1925 births
1993 deaths
Actresses from Hollywood, Los Angeles
20th-century American actresses